The Grammy Award for Best Soul Gospel Performance, Female was awarded from 1984 to 1989.  In 1990 this award was combined with the award for Best Soul Gospel Performance, Male as the Grammy Award for Best Soul Gospel Performance, Male or Female.

Years reflect the year in which the Grammy Awards were presented, for works released in the previous year.

Recipients

See also

 List of music awards honoring women

References

Grammy Awards for gospel music
Music awards honoring women